This is a list of notable footballers who have played for Coventry City Football Club from the beginning of the club's official records in 1883 to the present day.

For a list of all Coventry City players with a Wikipedia article, see :Category:Coventry City F.C. players, and for the current squad see the main Coventry City F.C. article.

Players with 100 or more first-team appearances
Correct as of match on 18 March 2023.

Explanation of list
Players should be listed in chronological order according to the year in which they first played for the club, and then by alphabetical order of their surname. Appearances and goals should include substitute appearances, but exclude wartime matches. Further information on competitions/seasons which are regarded as eligible for appearance stats are provided below, and if a player's data is not available for any of these competitions an appropriate note should be added to the table.

League appearances/goals
 Southern League: (1908–09 to 1914–15)
 Football League / Premier League: (1919–20 to present)

Total appearances/goals
The figures for total appearances/goals should include the League figures together with the following competitions:
 FA Cup (1895–96 to present)
 Football League Cup (1960–61 to present)
 Football League Trophy (2012–13 to 2019–20)
 Football League Third Division South Cup (1933–34 to 1935–36)
 Full Members Cup (1985–86 to 1991–92)
 Fairs Cup (1970–71)
 Texaco Cup (1971–72 to 1973–74)
 FA Charity Shield (1987–88)

Chronology of players

Footnotes
A. Doyle, Burge, Shipley, Kelly, Hyam, Biamou's numbers include 3 appearances in English Football League play-offs matches.
B. Willis' numbers include 2 appearances in English Football League play-offs matches.
C. Willis, Shipley's numbers include 1 goal in English Football League play-offs matches.
D. Biamou's numbers include 2 goals in English Football League play-offs matches.

Players who have scored hat-tricks for the club
Correct as of match on 18 March 2023.

Chronology of hat-trick players

Summary of hat-trick players

Footnotes
E. Four goals scored: Enright against Newport County; Paterson against Doncaster Rovers; Herbert against Watford; Bourton against Bristol City and Mansfield Town; Lake against Bristol Rovers and Luton Town; Bacon against Crystal Palace; Lowrie against Sheffield Wednesday, Luton Town and Bradford PA; Rogers against Aldershot; Stewart against Carlisle; Satchwell against Wrexham; Ferguson against Ipswich Town; and Livingstone against Sunderland.
F. Five goals scored: Smith against Brentford; Bourton against Bournemouth &BA; Bacon against Gillingham; Regis against Chester City.

References

 

Players
 
Coventry City
Association football player non-biographical articles